The Ideal Democratic Party (PDI) is a political party in Rwanda.

History
The party was established as the Islamic Democratic Party (Parti Démocratique Islamique) in 1992.

In 2003 the party adopted its current name as a result of a constitutional prohibition on religious-based parties. It contested the September parliamentary 2003 elections as part of an alliance led by the ruling Rwandan Patriotic Front (RPF), winning two seats. PDI leader Mussa Harerimana was subsequently appointed Minister of the Interior.

The PDI continued its alliance with the RPF for the 2008 parliamentary elections, in which it won a single seat. It remained part of the alliance for the 2013 elections, retaining its one seat.

References

External links
Official website

Political parties in Rwanda
Islamic democratic political parties
Islamic organisations based in Rwanda
Political parties established in 1992
1992 establishments in Rwanda